36th Army may refer to:

 Thirty-Sixth Army (Japan)
 36th Army (Russia)
 36th Army (Soviet Union)